Nina Baym (1936–2018) was an American literary critic and literary historian. She was professor of English at the University of Illinois at Urbana-Champaign from 1963 to 2004.

Before her retirement at the University of Illinois Baym was a Swanlund Endowed Chair, a Jubilee Professor of Liberal Arts & Sciences and a Center of Advanced Study Professor of English. Her work in US literary criticism and history is widely credited with expanding the field to include women writers while taking the focus off "great" writers according to a supposed unchanging value judgment and placing it instead on the dynamics of literary professionalism. She is the author or editor of a number of groundbreaking works of American literary history and criticism, beginning with Woman's Fiction (Cornell, 1978), and including Feminism and American Literary History (Rutgers, 1992), American Women Writers and the Work of History (Rutgers, 1995), and American Women of Letters and the Nineteenth-Century Sciences (Rutgers, 2004). She is also the author of scores of articles, reviews, and essays including "Melodramas of Beset Manhood: How Theories of American Fiction Exclude Women Authors" (American Quarterly 1981). Elaine Showalter called Baym's  Women Writers of the American West, 1833-1927 (2011), "the first comprehensive guide to women's writing in the old West," an immediately "standard and classic text."  This book uncovers and describes the western-themed writing in diverse genres of almost 350 American women, most of them unknown today but many of them successful and influential in their own time. Since 1991 Baym has served as General Editor of The Norton Anthology of American Literature.

In October 2013 she was recognized by the college of Liberal Arts and Sciences in connection with the 100th anniversary of the college; she was designated as one of the 25 most influential people in the college's history. She has been active in such professional associations as the American Literature Section of the Modern Language Association and the American Studies Association, as well as serving as Director of the School of Humanities at the University of Illinois from 1976-1987.  She has served on panels for the National Endowment for the Humanities and the Fulbight Foundation. Among her numerous literary prizes, fellowship, and honors are the 2000 Jay B. Hubbell Award for lifetime achievement in American literary studies (from the Modern Language Association) and fellowships from the John Simon Guggenheim Foundation, the National Endowment for the Humanities, the American Association of University Women, and the Mellon Foundation.

Baym was born in Princeton, New Jersey; her father was the eminent mathematician Leo Zippin and her mother taught high school English. She received her B.A. from Cornell University, an M.A. from Radcliffe, and a Ph.D. from Harvard University. She was married to Gordon Baym from 1958 to 1970; their two children are Nancy Baym and Geoffrey Baym. She was married to Jack Stillinger from 1971 to her death.

Books authored or edited 
 Women Writers of the American West, 1833-1927, Illinois, 2011
 Norton Anthology of American Literature, 3rd through 8th editions. W.W. Norton, 1985–present.
 American Women of Letters and the Nineteenth-Century Sciences. Rutgers, 2002.
 American Women Writers and the Work of History. Rutgers, 1995.
 Feminism and American Literary History: Essays. Rutgers, 1992.
 Woman's Fiction. Cornell University Press, 1978.
 Shape of Hawthorne's Career. Cornell University Press, 1976.

References

External links
 Melville's Quarrel with Fiction an essay.

1936 births
2018 deaths
American literary critics
Women literary critics
University of Illinois faculty
Radcliffe College alumni
Cornell University alumni
American women critics